The Evening Standard British Film Awards were established in 1973 by London's Evening Standard newspaper. The Standard Awards is the only ceremony "dedicated to British and Irish talent," judged by a panel of "top UK critics." Each ceremony honours films from the previous year.

1973–1980 Winners

1973 Winners
Best Actor : Keith Michell – Henry VIII and His Six Wives
Best Actress : Glenda Jackson – Mary, Queen of Scots
Best Comedy : The National Health – Jack Gold
Best Film : Ryan's Daughter – David Lean
Best Newcomer – Actor : Simon Ward
Best Newcomer – Actress : Lynne Frederick

1974 Winners
Best Actor : Michael Caine – Sleuth
Best Actress : Glenda Jackson – A Touch of Class
Best Comedy : The Three Musketeers – Richard Lester
Best Film : Live and Let Die – Guy Hamilton
Best Newcomer – Actor : Edward Fox
Best Newcomer – Actress : Heather Wright

1975 Winners
Best Actor : Albert Finney – Murder on the Orient Express
Best Actress : Wendy Hiller – Murder on the Orient Express
Best Comedy : The Four Musketeers – Richard Lester
Best Film : Murder on the Orient Express – Sidney Lumet
Best Newcomer – Actor : Robin Askwith
Best Newcomer – Actress : Jill Townsend

1976 Winners
Best Actor : Peter Sellers – The Return of the Pink Panther
Best Actress : Annette Crosbie – The Slipper and the Rose
Best Comedy : The Return of the Pink Panther – Blake Edwards
Best Film : Aces High – Jack Gold
Best Newcomer – Actor : Peter Firth
Best Newcomer – Actress : Gemma Craven

1977 Winners
Best Actor : John Thaw – Sweeney!
Best Actress : Billie Whitelaw – The Omen
Best Comedy : The Pink Panther Strikes Again – Blake Edwards
Best Film : A Bridge Too Far – Richard Attenborough
Best Newcomer – Actor : Dennis Waterman
Best Newcomer – Actress : Lesley-Anne Down

1978 Winners
Best Actor : Alec Guinness – Star Wars
Best Actress : Nanette Newman – International Velvet
Best Comedy : Revenge of the Pink Panther – Blake Edwards
Best Film : Star Wars – George Lucas
Best Newcomer – Actor : Michael J. Jackson
Best Newcomer – Actress : Lea Brodie

1979 Winners
Best Actor : Peter Ustinov – Death on the Nile
Best Actress : Maggie Smith – California Suite
Best Comedy : Porridge – Dick Clement
Best Film : Death on the Nile – John Guillermin
Best Newcomer – Actor : Simon MacCorkindale
Best Newcomer – Actress : Karen Dotrice

1980 Winners
Best Actor : Denholm Elliott – Bad Timing, Rising Damp, Zulu Dawn
Best Actress : Frances de la Tour – Rising Damp
Best Comedy : Rising Damp – Joseph McGrath
Best Film : Yanks – John Schlesinger
Best Newcomer – Actor : Jonathan Pryce
Best Newcomer – Actress : Wendy Morgan
Peter Sellers Award for Comedy : Leonard Rossiter

1981–1990 Winners

1981 Winners
Best Actor : Bob Hoskins – The Long Good Friday
Best Actress : Maggie Smith – Quartet
Best Film : The French Lieutenant's Woman – Karel Reisz
Best Screenplay : Colin Welland – Chariots of Fire
Most Promising Filmmaker : Franco Rosso
Peter Sellers Award for Comedy : Bill Forsyth

1982 Winners
Best Actor : Trevor Howard – Light Years Away
Best Actress : Jennifer Kendal – 36 Chowringhee Lane
Best Film : Moonlighting – Jerzy Skolimowski
Best Screenplay : John Krish – Friend or Foe
Most Promising Newcomer : Cassie McFarlane
Peter Sellers Award for Comedy : Michael Blakemore

1983 Winners
Best Actor : Ben Kingsley – Gandhi, Betrayal
Best Actress : Phyllis Logan – Another Time, Another Place
Best Film : The Ploughman's Lunch – Richard Eyre
Best Screenplay : Ian McEwan – The Ploughman's Lunch
Best Technical or Artistic Achievement : Chris Menges
Most Promising Newcomer : Neil Jordan
Peter Sellers Award for Comedy : Bill Forsyth
Special Award : Richard Attenborough

1984 Winners
Best Actor : John Hurt – 1984, Champions, The Hit
Best Actress : Helen Mirren – Cal
Best Film : 1984 – Michael Radford
Best Screenplay : Bernard MacLaverty – Cal
Best Technical or Artistic Achievement : John Alcott
Most Promising Newcomer : Tim Roth
Peter Sellers Award for Comedy : Denholm Elliott

1985 Winners
Best Actor : Victor Banerjee – A Passage to India
Best Actress : Miranda Richardson – Dance with a Stranger
Best Film : My Beautiful Laundrette – Stephen Frears
Best Screenplay : Malcolm Mowbray, Alan Bennett – A Private Function
Best Technical or Artistic Achievement : Norman Garwood
Most Promising Newcomer : Margi Clarke, Alexandra Pigg
Peter Sellers Award for Comedy : Michael Palin
Special Award : George Harrison, Denis O'Brien

1986 Winners
Best Actor : Ray McAnally – The Mission, No Surrender
Best Actress : Coral Browne – Dreamchild
Best Film : A Room with a View
Best Screenplay : Robert Bolt – The Mission
Best Technical or Artistic Achievement : Tony Pierce-Roberts – A Room with a View
Most Promising Newcomer : Gary Oldman – Sid and Nancy
Peter Sellers Award for Comedy : Clockwise – John Cleese
Special Award : Jake Eberts
Special Award: George Harrison and Dennis O'Brien

1987 Winners
Best Actor : Derek Jacobi – Little Dorrit
Best Actress : Emily Lloyd – Wish You Were Here
Best Film : Hope and Glory – John Boorman
Best Screenplay : Alan Bennett – Prick Up Your Ears
Best Technical or Artistic Achievement : Anthony Pratt – Hope and Glory
Most Promising Newcomer : Harry Hook – The Kitchen Toto
Peter Sellers Award for Comedy : Personal Services, Wish You Were Here – David Leland

1988 Winners
Best Actor : Bob Hoskins – Who Framed Roger Rabbit, The Lonely Passion of Judith Hearne
Best Actress : Billie Whitelaw – The Dressmaker, Maggie Smith – The Lonely Passion of Judith Hearne
Best Film : A Fish Called Wanda – Charles Crichton
Best Screenplay : Bruce Robinson – Withnail and I
Best Technical or Artistic Achievement : William Diver, Patrick Duval – Distant Voices, Still Lives
Most Promising Newcomer : Kristin Scott Thomas – A Handful of Dust, Jodhi May – A World Apart
Peter Sellers Award for Comedy : A Fish Called Wanda – Charles Crichton
Special Award : Richard Williams

1989 Winners
Best Actor : Daniel Day-Lewis – My Left Foot
Best Actress : Pauline Collins – Shirley Valentine
Best Film : Henry V – Kenneth Branagh
Best Screenplay : Willy Russell – Shirley Valentine
Best Technical or Artistic Achievement : Anton Furst – Batman
Most Promising Newcomer : Andi Engel– Melancholia
Peter Sellers Award for Comedy : High Hopes – Mike Leigh
Special Award : Peter Greenaway

1990 Winners
Best Actor : Iain Glen – Mountains of the Moon, Fools of Fortune, Silent Scream
Best Actress : Natasha Richardson – The Comfort of Strangers, The Handmaid's Tale
Best Film : The Krays – Peter Medak
Best Screenplay : Michael Eaton – Fellow Traveller
Best Technical or Artistic Achievement : David Watkin – Memphis Belle
Most Promising Newcomer : Philip Ridley – The Krays
Peter Sellers Award for Comedy : Robbie Coltrane

1991–2000 Winners

1991 Winners
Best Actor : Alan Rickman – Robin Hood: Prince of Thieves, Close My Eyes, Truly Madly Deeply
Best Actress : Juliet Stevenson – Truly, Madly, Deeply
Best Film : Close My Eyes – Stephen Poliakoff
Best Screenplay : Neil Jordan – The Miracle
Best Technical or Artistic Achievement : Sandy Powell – Edward II, The Miracle, The Pope Must Die
Most Promising Newcomer : Anthony Minghella – Truly, Madly, Deeply
Peter Sellers Award for Comedy : The Commitments – Dick Clement, Roddy Doyle, Ian La Frenais

1992 Winners
Best Actor : Daniel Day-Lewis – The Last of the Mohicans
Best Actress : Emma Thompson – Howards End, Peter's Friends
Best Film : Howards End – James Ivory
Best Screenplay : Terence Davies – The Long Day Closes
Best Technical or Artistic Achievement : Sue Gibson – Hear My Song, Secret Friends
Most Promising Newcomer : Peter Chelsom – Hear My Song
Peter Sellers Award for Comedy : Peter's Friends

1993 Winners
Best Actor : David Thewlis – Naked
Best Actress : Emma Thompson – The Remains of the Day, Much Ado About Nothing
Best Film : Raining Stones – Ken Loach
Best Screenplay : Jim Allen – Raining Stones
Best Technical or Artistic Achievement : Sandy Powell – Orlando, Stuart Craig – The Secret Garden
Most Promising Newcomer : Vadim Jean, Gary Sinyor – Leon the Pig Farmer
Peter Sellers Award for Comedy : Les Blair – Bad Behaviour
Special Award : Anthony Hopkins

1994 Winners
Best Actor : Ben Kingsley – Schindler's List
Best Actress : Kristin Scott Thomas – Four Weddings and a Funeral
Best Film : In the Name of the Father – Jim Sheridan
Best Screenplay : Richard Curtis – Four Weddings and a Funeral
Best Technical or Artistic Achievement : Dave Borthwick, Richard 'Hutch' Hutchinson – The Secret Adventures of Tom Thumb
Most Promising Newcomer : Ian Hart – Backbeat, Gurinder Chadha – Bhaji on the Beach
Peter Sellers Award for Comedy : Hugh Grant – Four Weddings and a Funeral
Special Award : Alec Guinness

1995 Winners
Best Actor : Jonathan Pryce – Carrington
Best Actress : Kristin Scott Thomas – Angels & Insects
Best Film : The Madness of King George – Nicholas Hytner
Best Screenplay : Alan Bennett – The Madness of King George
Best Technical and Artistic Achievement : Andrew Dunn – The Madness of King George
Most Promising Newcomer : Danny Boyle – Shallow Grave
Peter Sellers Award for Comedy : Peter Chelsom – Funny Bones
Special Award : Lewis Gilbert

1996 Winners
Best Actor : Liam Neeson – Michael Collins
Best Actress : Kate Winslet – Sense and Sensibility, Jude
Best Film : Richard III – Ian McKellen
Best Screenplay : Emma Thompson – Sense and Sensibility, John Hodge – Trainspotting
Best Technical or Artistic Achievement : Tony Burrough – Richard III
Most Promising Newcomer : Emily Watson – Breaking the Waves
Peter Sellers Award for Comedy : Mark Herman – Brassed Off
Special Award : Leslie Phillips

1997 Winners
Best Actor : Robert Carlyle – The Full Monty, Carla's Song, Face
Best Actress : Katrin Cartlidge – Career Girls
Best Film : The Full Monty – Peter Cattaneo
Best Screenplay : Jeremy Brock – Mrs Brown
Best Technical or Artistic Achievement : Maria Djurkovic – Wilde
Most Promising Newcomer : Jude Law – Wilde
Peter Sellers Award for Comedy : Antony Sher – Mrs Brown
Special Award : Ray Boulting, Kenneth Branagh – Hamlet

1998 Winners
Best Actor : Derek Jacobi – Love Is the Devil
Best Actress : Julie Christie – Afterglow
Best Film : The General – John Boorman
Best Screenplay : Eileen Atkins – Mrs Dalloway
Best Technical or Artistic Achievement : Ashley Rowe – The Woodlanders, The Governess, Still Crazy, Twenty Four Seven
Most Promising Newcomer : Guy Ritchie – Lock, Stock and Two Smoking Barrels
Peter Sellers Award for Comedy : Bill Nighy – Still Crazy
Special Award : Ken Loach,  Michael Caine

1999 Winners
Best Actor : Jeremy Northam – An Ideal Husband, The Winslow Boy
Best Actress : Samantha Morton – Dreaming of Joseph Lees
Best Film : East Is East – Damien O'Donnell
Best Screenplay : Tom Stoppard – Shakespeare in Love
Best Technical or Artistic Achievement : John de Borman – Hideous Kinky
Most Promising Newcomer : Peter Mullan – Orphans
Peter Sellers Award for Comedy : Hugh Grant – Notting Hill
Special Award : Freddie Francis

2000 Winners
Best Actor : Jim Broadbent – Topsy-Turvy
Best Actress : Julie Walters – Billy Elliot
Best Film : Topsy-Turvy – Mike Leigh
Best Screenplay : Neil Jordan – The End of the Affair
Best Technical or Artistic Achievement : Andrew Sanders – The Golden Bowl
Most Promising Newcomer : Jamie Bell – Billy Elliot
Peter Sellers Award for Comedy : Peter Lord, Nick Park – Chicken Run
Special Award : Peter Yates

2001–2010 Winners

2001 Winners
Best Film : Gosford Park
Best Actor : Linus Roache – Pandaemonium
Best Actress : Kate Winslet – Quills, Enigma, Iris
Best Screenplay : Richard Curtis, Andrew Davies, Helen Fielding – Bridget Jones's Diary
Most Promising Newcomer : Ben Hopkins – The Nine Lives of Tomas Katz
Peter Sellers Award for Comedy : Hugh Grant – Bridget Jones's Diary
Technical Achievement Award : Stuart Craig – Harry Potter and the Philosopher's Stone
Special Award : Christopher Lee

2002 Winners
Best Film : Dirty Pretty Things
Best Actor : Chiwetel Ejiofor – Dirty Pretty Things
Best Actress : Catherine Zeta-Jones – Chicago
Best Screenplay : Lawless Heart – Neil Hunter, Tom Hunsinger
Most Promising Newcomer : Asif Kapadia – The Warrior
Peter Sellers Award for Comedy : Keith Fulton, Louis Pepe, Lucy Darwin – Lost in La Mancha
Technical Achievement Award : Eve Stewart – production designer, All or Nothing
Special Award : Michael G. Wilson and Barbara Broccoli – 40 years of James Bond

2003 Winners
Best Film : Touching the Void
Best Actor : Paul Bettany – Master and Commander: The Far Side of the World, The Heart of Me
Best Actress : Emma Thompson – Love Actually
Best Screenplay : Buffalo Soldiers – Gregor Jordan, Nora Maccoby, Eric Weiss
Most Promising Newcomer : Max Pirkis – Master and Commander: The Far Side of the World
Peter Sellers Award for Comedy : Bill Nighy – Love Actually
Technical Achievement Award : The Hours – Seamus McGarvey
Alexander Walker Special Award : Michael Winterbottom

2004 Winners
Best Film : Vera Drake
Best Actor : Paddy Considine – Dead Man's Shoes
Best Actress : Imelda Staunton – Vera Drake
Best Screenplay : My Summer of Love – Paweł Pawlikowski
Most Promising Newcomer : Emily Blunt, Natalie Press – My Summer of Love
Peter Sellers Award for Comedy : Simon Pegg – Shaun of the Dead
Technical Achievement Award : Roger Deakins – The Village, The Ladykillers
Alexander Walker Special Award : Working Title Films

2005 Winners
Best Film : The Constant Gardener
Best Actor : Ralph Fiennes – The Constant Gardener
Best Actress : Natasha Richardson – Asylum
Best Screenplay : Mark O'Halloran – Adam & Paul
Most Promising Newcomer : Saul Dibb – Bullet Boy
Technical Achievement Award : Neil Marshall – The Descent
Peter Sellers Award for Comedy : Tom Hollander – Pride & Prejudice
Alexander Walker Special Award : Nick Park

2006 Winners
Best Film : United 93
Best Actor : Daniel Craig – Casino Royale
Best Actress : Judi Dench – Notes on a Scandal
Best Screenplay : Peter Morgan – The Queen, The Last King of Scotland
Most Promising Newcomer : Paul Andrew Williams – London to Brighton
Technical Achievement Award : Anthony Dod Mantle – Brothers of the Head, The Last King of Scotland
Peter Sellers Award for Comedy : Sacha Baron Cohen – Borat
Alexander Walker Special Award : Stephen Frears

2007 Winners
Best Film : Control
Best Film Score : There Will Be Blood – Jonny Greenwood
Best Actor : Daniel Day-Lewis – There Will Be Blood
Best Actress : Helena Bonham Carter – Sweeney Todd: The Demon Barber of Fleet Street
Best Screenplay : Matt Greenhalgh – Control
Most Promising Newcomer : John Carney –  Once
Technical Achievement Award : Seamus McGarvey (cinematographer), Sarah Greenwood (production designer), Jacqueline Durran (costume designer) – Atonement
Alexander Walker Special Award : Julie Christie

2008 Winners
Best Film : Hunger
Best Director : Stephen Daldry – The Reader
Best Actor : Michael Sheen – Frost/Nixon, Pat Shortt – Garage
Best Actress : Tilda Swinton – Julia
Best Screenplay : Martin McDonagh – In Bruges
Most Promising Newcomer : Joanna Hogg –  Unrelated
Technical Achievement Award : Mark Digby – Slumdog Millionaire
Peter Sellers Award for Comedy : Sally Hawkins – Happy-Go-Lucky
Alexander Walker Special Award : Mike Leigh

2009 Winners
Best Film : Fish Tank
Best Actor : Andy Serkis – Sex & Drugs & Rock & Roll
Best Actress : Anne-Marie Duff – Nowhere Boy
Best Screenplay : Jesse Armstrong, Simon Blackwell, Armando Iannucci and Tony Roche – In The Loop
Most Promising Newcomer : Peter Strickland –  Katalin Varga
Best Documentary : Anvil! The Story of Anvil
Technical Achievement Award : Barry Ackroyd (cinematographer) – The Hurt Locker
Peter Sellers Award for Comedy : Sacha Baron Cohen – Brüno
Alexander Walker Special Award : Nicolas Roeg

2010 Winners
Best Film : Neds
Best Actor : Andrew Garfield – The Social Network & Never Let Me Go
Best Actress : Kristin Scott Thomas – Leaving
Best Screenplay : Clio Barnard – The Arbor
Most Promising Newcomer : Ben Wheatley –  Director/Co-Producer of Down Terrace
Best Documentary : John Krish – A Day in the Life: Four Portraits of Post-War Britain
Technical Achievement Award : Gareth Edwards, for his Cinematography, Production Design and Visual Effects of Monsters
Peter Sellers Award for Comedy : Roger Allam – Tamara Drewe
Alexander Walker Special Award : Christopher Nolan for his contribution to film

2011–2020 Winners

2011 Winners
Best Film : We Need to Talk About Kevin
Best Actor : Michael Fassbender – Shame & Jane Eyre
Best Actress : Olivia Colman – Tyrannosaur
Best Screenplay : Andrew Haigh – Weekend
Most Promising Newcomer : Tom Kingsley & Will Sharpe –  Co-writers/Directors of Black Pond
Best Documentary : Senna
Technical Achievement Award : Robbie Ryan, for his Cinematography on Wuthering Heights
Peter Sellers Award for Comedy : The Guard
Alexander Walker Special Award : John Hurt for his contribution to cinema

2016 Winners
Best Film : Brooklyn
Best Actor : Idris Elba – Beasts of No Nation
Best Actress : Maggie Smith – The Lady in the Van
Best Documentary : Amy
Blockbuster of the Year : Star Wars: The Force Awakens
Editor's Award : 45 Years
Best Screenplay : Emma Donoghue – Room
Rising Star : Maisie Williams – The Falling
Comedy Award : Emma Thompson – The Legend of Barney Thomson
Technical Achievement : Mark Digby – production designer on Ex Machina
Outstanding Contribution : Alan Bennett

2017 Winners
Best Film : I, Daniel Blake
Best Actor : Hugh Grant – Florence Foster Jenkins
Best Actress : Kate Beckinsale – Love & Friendship
Best Supporting Actor : Arinze Kene – The Pass
Best Supporting Actress : Hayley Squires – I, Daniel Blake
Best Documentary : Before the Flood
Best Screenplay : Guy Hibbert – Eye in the Sky
Comedy Award : Bridget Jones's Baby
Breakthrough of the Year : Florence Pugh – Lady Macbeth
Technical Achievement : Max Richter – contribution of his music on Arrival
Most Powerful Scene : I, Daniel Blake
International Film of the Year : Lion
Editor's Award : Fantastic Beasts and Where to Find Them

2018 Winners
Best Film : God's Own Country
Best Actor : Daniel Kaluuya – Get Out
Best Actress : Kristin Scott Thomas – The Party
Best Supporting Actor : Simon Russell Beale – The Death of Stalin
Best Supporting Actress : Gemma Jones – God's Own Country
Best Screenplay : Sally Potter – The Party
Comedy Award : Paddington 2
Breakthrough of the Year : Rungano Nyoni – I Am Not a Witch
Technical Achievement : Gary Williamson – contribution of his production design on Paddington 2

References

Film Awards
Awards established in 1973
1973 establishments in the United Kingdom
London awards
British film awards